Albert Shugg (5 July 1894 – 20 July 1941) was an Australian cricketer. He played two first-class matches for Tasmania between 1924 and 1925.

See also
 List of Tasmanian representative cricketers

References

External links
 

1894 births
1941 deaths
Australian cricketers
Tasmania cricketers
Cricketers from Melbourne